Chitralada railway station or Suan Chitralada royal railway station is a railway station in Thailand, located on Sawankhalok Rd, Suan Chitlada Subdistrict, Dusit District, Bangkok.

It is a special railway station that only serves the royal family when traveling by train. It is located on the side of Sawankhalok Rd, opposite the Chitralada Royal Villa, 3.29 km (2 mi) from Hua Lamphong (Bangkok railway station), considered in the middle between Yommarat and Ramathibodi Hospital halts 

Chitralada railway station was originally a wooden building built in the reign of King Chulalongkorn (Rama V). Later, in the year 1921, during the reign of King Vajiravudh (Rama VI), the construction of a new station  was a single-storey brick building. There is a dome that was built according to the Italian Renaissance architecture to replace the original wooden building.

References

Dusit district
Railway stations in Thailand
Unregistered ancient monuments in Bangkok